William Henry Townsend (17 February 1821 – 26 February 1891) was an English first-class cricketer and barrister.

The son of Robert Townsend, he was born at Mansfield in February 1821. He later studied at Lincoln College, Oxford where he played first-class cricket for Oxford University. He made his first-class debut against Cambridge University in The University Match of 1842. He made three further first-class appearances for Oxford, making a further appearance in 1842 and two appearances in 1843. His four first-class wickets all came in one match, against the Marylebone Cricket Club in 1842 at Lord's. A student of Lincoln's Inn, he was called to the bar as a barrister in November 1847. Townsend died at Dulwich in February 1891.

References

External links

1821 births
1891 deaths
Sportspeople from Mansfield
Cricketers from Nottinghamshire
Alumni of Lincoln College, Oxford
English cricketers
Oxford University cricketers
Members of Lincoln's Inn
English barristers
19th-century English lawyers